St. Philomene Catholic Church and Rectory is a historic Roman Catholic church along Louisiana Highway 1 in Labadieville, Assumption Parish, Louisiana.

It was built in c.1888 and added to the National Register of Historic Places in 1983.

The church is a five-bay Basilica plan church with a central front tower with an octagonal spire.

The rectory, listed as a contributing building, is contemporaneous with the church.

References

See also
National Register of Historic Places listings in Assumption Parish, Louisiana

Roman Catholic churches in Louisiana
Churches on the National Register of Historic Places in Louisiana
Roman Catholic churches completed in 1888
Churches in Assumption Parish, Louisiana
National Register of Historic Places in Assumption Parish, Louisiana
19th-century Roman Catholic church buildings in the United States